Antonijo Pranjič (born 14 January 1985) is a Slovenian football defender.

See also
Football in Slovenia
List of football clubs in Slovenia

References

External links
Profile at Prvaliga.si

Slovenian footballers
Living people
1985 births
Association football defenders